Tappeh Rash is a village in Ab Barik Rural District, in the Central District of Sonqor County, Kermanshah Province, Iran. At the 2006 census, its population was 160, in 39 families.

References 

Populated places in Sonqor County